O'Neil Anthony Michael Tyrone Thompson (born 11 August 1983) is a Jamaican international footballer who professionally for Arnett Gardens F.C. Thompson can play as either a defender or midfielder.

Career

Club career
Born in Kingston, Thompson began his senior career with Boys' Town in 2003. He moved to Norwegian side Notodden FK in 2007, spending three seasons with the club. He then moved to English side Barnsley in August 2009. On 18 January 2010 Thompson moved to League Two side Burton Albion on a month-long loan. On 14 May 2010, Thompson was set to join Darlington, but the deal fell through, and he later signed a loan deal with Hereford United.

On 1 November 2010, Barnsley, Hereford, and Thompson agreed to cancel the player's contracts after he said he wanted to return home to Jamaica, Thompson made a total of 11 appearances in English football across all competitions. where he re-signed for Boys' Town in January 2011.

International career
Thompson made his international debut for Jamaica in an April 2006 friendly match against the United States.

Thompson has played at the 2008 Caribbean Championship and 2009 CONCACAF Gold Cup, as well as in 2 World Cup Qualifying matches.

Honors 

Arnett Gardens F.C.

Jamaica National Premier League: 1
 2015

References
General

Specific

1983 births
Living people
Jamaican footballers
Jamaica international footballers
Jamaican expatriate footballers
Notodden FK players
Barnsley F.C. players
Norwegian First Division players
English Football League players
Expatriate footballers in England
Expatriate footballers in Norway
Burton Albion F.C. players
Hereford United F.C. players
2009 CONCACAF Gold Cup players
Expatriate footballers in Trinidad and Tobago
TT Pro League players
Boys' Town F.C. players
Association football defenders
National Premier League players
Association football midfielders